Manuel Villareal can refer to:

 Manuel Villareal (Filipino sailor)
 Manuel Villareal (Mexican sailor)